Herbert James Starr (July 11, 1931July 20, 2009) was a Michigan politician.

Early life and education
Starr was born on July 11, 1931 in Bedford, Indiana. Starr graduated from Lansing Eastern High School in 1949, Michigan State University in 1954, and Wayne State University Law School in 1960.

Military career
Starr served in the United States Army from 1954 to 1956 and was stationed in Germany for two years.

Career
Starr was an attorney. On November 4, 1964, Starr was elected to the Michigan House of Representatives where he represented the 57th district from January 13, 1965 to December 31, 1966. Starr was defeated when he sought re-election in 1966. In 1969, Starr was defeated in the Democratic primary for the mayor of Lansing.

Personal life
In 1958, Starr married Phyllis Anne McConnell. Together, they had two children.

Death
Starr died on July 20, 2009 in Lansing, Michigan. He was interred at Evergreen Cemetery in Lansing.

References

1931 births
2009 deaths
20th-century American lawyers
20th-century American politicians
Burials in Michigan
Democratic Party members of the Michigan House of Representatives
Michigan lawyers
Michigan State University alumni
Military personnel from Michigan
People from Bedford, Indiana
Politicians from Lansing, Michigan
United States Army soldiers
Wayne State University Law School alumni